KSEP may refer to:

 KSEP-LP, a low-power radio station (99.9 FM) licensed to Brookings, Oregon, United States
 Stephenville Clark Regional Airport in Stephenville, Texas (ICAO: KSEP)